Uniontown is a town in Whitman County, Washington, United States. The population was 294 at the 2010 census.

History
Uniontown was first settled in 1878 by Thomas Montgomery. Agreement could not be reached on a town name until the following year, when Joseph Cataldo a Jesuit priest, suggested the name "Uniontown" after the similarly-named creek and flat nearby. Uniontown was incorporated in 1890.

Geography
Uniontown is located at  (46.539098, -117.085331).  The elevation is 2582 feet (787 m) above sea level.

Climate
This region experiences warm (but not hot) and dry summers, with no average monthly temperatures above 71.6 °F.  According to the Köppen Climate Classification system, Uniontown has a warm-summer Mediterranean climate, abbreviated "Csb" on climate maps.

Demographics

2010 census
As of the census of 2010, there were 294 people, 130 households, and 85 families living in the town. The racial makeup of the town was 95.6% White, 0.3% Native American, 1.0% Asian, 0.3% from other races, and 2.7% from two or more races. Hispanic or Latino of any race were 1.4% of the population.

There were 130 households, of which 21.5% had children under the age of 18 living with them, 58.5% were married couples living together, 4.6% had a female householder with no husband present, 2.3% had a male householder with no wife present, and 34.6% were non-families. 30.0% of all households were made up of individuals, and 8.4% had someone living alone who was 65 years of age or older. The average household size was 2.26 and the average family size was 2.84.

The median age in the town was 44.6 years. 18.7% of residents were under the age of 18; 9.5% were between the ages of 18 and 24; 22.5% were from 25 to 44; 32.3% were from 45 to 64; and 17% were 65 years of age or older. The gender makeup of the town was 51.4% male and 48.6% female.

2000 census
As of the census of 2000, there were 345 people, 133 households, and 96 families living in the town. The population density was 380.1 people per square mile (146.4/km2). There were 160 housing units at an average density of 176.3 per square mile (67.9/km2). The racial makeup of the town was 97.10% White, 0.58% Asian, 2.32% from other races. Hispanic or Latino of any race were 4.64% of the population.

There were 133 households, out of which 33.1% had children under the age of 18 living with them, 60.2% were married couples living together, 9.8% had a female householder with no husband present, and 27.1% were non-families. 22.6% of all households were made up of individuals, and 6.8% had someone living alone who was 65 years of age or older. The average household size was 2.59 and the average family size was 3.06.

In the town, the age distribution of the population shows 29.6% under the age of 18, 6.7% from 18 to 24, 26.7% from 25 to 44, 24.3% from 45 to 64, and 12.8% who were 65 years of age or older. The median age was 37 years. For every 100 females, there were 97.1 males. For every 100 females age 18 and over, there were 99.2 males.

The median income for a household in the town was $36,042, and the median income for a family was $46,250. Males had a median income of $31,607 versus $21,250 for females. The per capita income for the town was $16,390. About 2.1% of families and 2.3% of the population were below the poverty line, including 1.8% of those under age 18 and 4.2% of those age 65 or over.

Police

Uniontown maintains a Part-Time Chief of Police position to provide law enforcement services.  When the Chief is off duty or otherwise not available, Whitman County Sheriff's Office handles calls for service and law enforcement in the town.   The current Chief is also a full-time police officer in nearby Pullman, WA.  In the last decade the former chiefs/officers have all been Moscow Police Department officers looking for additional part-time work with the exception of one officer in 2008–2010, thus bringing experienced officers to the town.

References

External links
Town of Uniontown - Official site
Uniontown Washington - Uniontown Community Development Association

Towns in Whitman County, Washington
Towns in Washington (state)
1890 establishments in Washington (state)